FC Zelenograd is an association football club from Zelenograd, Moscow. The club was founded in 2002 and as of today it plays in the Russian championship between amateur football clubs, which is the fourth level of the Russian football league system.

History

Amateur Football League
FC Zelenograd was founded in 2002. In the same year they made their debut in Amateur Football League. Their roster consisted mainly of graduates from Sport School № 112 "Sputnik", which as of today, still serves as FC Zelenograd Sport School. Their debut was rather disappointing as they could only finish in the 16th place from 21 places.

A year after, FC Zelenograd was officially registered as a legal entity and once again participated in the AFL. In 2003 Zelenograd made an improvement as they finished in the 11th place. In 2004 and 2005, Zelenograd's performance improved and twice they ended up runners-up of the league. Finally, in 2006, the Zeleno-Belye won the Championship and thus won the right to participate in the Russian Second Division, ran by the Professional Football League. This meant that the club had to shift into a professional outfit and to reconstruct their home stadium, the Angstrem Stadium.

Russian Second Division
The club was successfully licensed to participate in the Second Division, and in their debut they ended in the 12th place. Zelenograd's stay in the Russian Second Division was a rather a disappointing one as the highest place that they ever achieved was the 11th place, with the worse being the 14th place, which signaled the end for the club as a professional one, even though technically the team was not relegated.

Return to the Amateur Football League
This is because, following the disappointing show in 2010, the Council of the club decided to withdraw the club from the Second Division and apply to participate in the recently formed Russian championship between amateur football clubs (III division), which replaced the Amateur Football League.

Current squad
As of October, 2011

References

External links
Official site 

Zelenograd
Association football clubs established in 2002
Football clubs in Moscow
2002 establishments in Russia